Khangarh may refer to:

 Khangarh, Punjab, in Punjab, Pakistan
 Khangarh, Sindh, in Sindh, Pakistan